Ta'Shauna "Sugar" Rodgers (born December 8, 1989) is an assistant coach and played her college ball for the Georgetown Hoyas..  A prolific three-point shooter, Rodgers was drafted by the Minnesota Lynx in part to fill the void created by the trade of Candice Wiggins.

At Georgetown, she was the school's all-time scoring leader, with 2,518 points, and the team's all-time steals leader, with 326, as well as holding the team record for 3-point field goals made. She was a four-time All Big East First Team pick, and was drafted by the Lynx in the second round as the 14th overall pick.

She is currently an assistant coach at The College of William and Mary.

Early life
Rodgers was born in Suffolk, Virginia to Barbara Mae Rodgers and Oscar Allen Saunders Jr. in 1989. Rodgers played basketball for her high school team at King's Fork High School, where she became the school's MVP all four years, conference Player of the Year three times, as well as a McDonald's All-American. She was named a Parade All-American in 2009. She graduated with her school's records in career points, assists, rebounds and blocks. At the 2007 AAU Nike Nationals, Sugar didn't start, but played in every game as for the Suffolk Blazers, and was named the tournament's MVP. Sugar's mother, who had played basketball herself at Booker T. Washington High School, died in 2005 from lupus, and her father died in July 2012.

College career
Rodgers was recruited to the Georgetown Hoyas in part through her play on the AAU Suffolk Blazers, who were coached by Boo Williams, the brother of Georgetown head coach Terri Williams-Flournoy. Rodgers excelled early at Georgetown, and was named 2010 Big East Freshman of the Year, as well as First Team All-Big East, a feat she repeated all four years. That year she led the team to new heights, propelling them into the national rankings for the first time in fifteen years, and helping the team to just its second NCAA Tournament invitation. In her sophomore year, she led the team to the NCAA's Sweet Sixteen with an upset win over rival Maryland, before losing to UConn.

In her four years, she amassed 2,518 points to become the leading scorer all-time at Georgetown on either the men's or women's team. The leading scorer on the men's team, Sleepy Floyd had 2,304 points, while Patrick Ewing had 2,184. She was a three-time AP Honorable Mention All-American, and majored in English.

Georgetown  statistics
Source

Professional
Rodgers was selected 2nd in the 2nd round of the 2013 WNBA Draft as the 14th overall pick by the Minnesota Lynx. She made the team out of training camp, and made her professional debut on June 1, 2013, in a victory over the Connecticut Sun. Rodgers has logged the most minutes of the three rookies on the team, earning playing time thanks to aggressive defense and hustle.

During the WNBA off season, Rodgers joined the Arras team in France. She was traded to the New York Liberty prior to the 2014 season. In the WNBA, she averages 18.8 minutes per game, 35.7% three-point field goals, and 7.8 PPG.

On April 11, 2019, Rodgers was traded to the Las Vegas Aces as part of a four-way deal that saw Rodgers head to Las Vegas in exchange for a second-round pick in the 2020 WNBA draft, which in turn was traded to the Atlanta Dream for guard Nia Coffey. Also involved in that trade was the acquisition of Tanisha Wright from the Minnesota Lynx in exchange for a second round pick in the 2020 WNBA Draft.

WNBA career statistics

Regular season

|-
|style="text-align:left;background:#afe6ba;"| 2013†
| align="left" | Minnesota
| 28 || 0 || 7.6 || .317 || .313 || .571 || 1.4 || 0.5 || 0.5 || 0.3 || 0.4 || 1.9
|-
| align="left" | 2014
| align="left" | New York
| 34 || 0 || 16.6 || .353 || .289 || .735 || 2.1 || 1.3 || 0.7 || 0.3 || 1.0 || 6.0
|-
| align="left" | 2015
| align="left" | New York
| 33 || 5 || 18.7 || .340 || .320 || .881 || 2.2 || 1.5 || 0.7 || 0.2 || 1.0 || 8.1
|-
| align="left" | 2016
| align="left" | New York
| 33 || 33 || 30.5 || .405 || .413 || .842 || 3.7 || 2.4 || 1.1 || 0.5 || 1.8 || 14.5
|-
| align="left" | 2017
| align="left" | New York
| 33 || 15 || 25.6 || .339 || .342 || .815 || 3.8 || 2.3 || 0.9 || 0.5 || 1.6 || 10.5
|-
| align="left" | 2018
| align="left" | New York
| 31 || 13 || 19.6 || .362 || .323 || .826 || 3.2 || 2.0 || 0.7 || 0.1 || 1.2 || 6.3
|-
| align="left" | 2019
| align="left" | Las Vegas
| 33 || 0 || 11.6 || .360 || .357 || .600 || 1.5 || 1.2 || 0.4 || 0.4 || 0.8 || 3.4
|-
| align="left" | 2020
| align="left" | Las Vegas
| 22 || 1 || 12.0 || .321 || .313 || .750 || 1.3 || 1.4 || 0.3 || 0.1 || 0.7 || 3.4
|-
| align="left" | Career
| align="left" | 8 years, 3 teams
| 247 || 67 || 18.2 || .359 || .346 || .816 || 2.5 || 1.6 || 0.7 || 0.3 || 1.1 || 7.0

Playoffs

|-
|style="text-align:left;background:#afe6ba;"| 2013†
| align="left" | Minnesota
| 5 || 0 || 2.2 || .250 || .000 || .500 || 0.2 || 0.0 || 0.0 || 0.0 || 0.0 || 0.6
|-
| align="left" | 2015
| align="left" | New York
| 6 || 0 || 17.0 || .372 || .438 || .875 || 1.7 || 2.5 || 1.0 || 0.3 || 1.5 || 8.8
|-
| align="left" | 2016
| align="left" | New York
| 1 || 1 || 24.0 || .444 || .250 || .667 || 2.0 || 3.0 || 0.0 || 0.0 || 0.0 || 11.0
|-
| align="left" | 2017
| align="left" | New York
| 1 || 0 || 18.0 || .375 || .333 || .000 || 3.0 || 3.0 || 1.0 || 0.0 || 2.0 || 8.0
|-
| align="left" | 2019
| align="left" | Las Vegas
| 5 || 0 || 5.4 || .143 || .167 || .000 || 1.0 || 0.2 || 0.2 || 0.0 || 0.6 || 0.6
|-
| align="left" | 2020
| align="left" | Las Vegas
| 8 || 0 || 9.9 || .143 || .167 || .000 || 1.1 || 1.0 || 0.3 || 0.0 || 0.6 || 1.1
|-
| align="left" | Career
| align="left" | 6 years, 3 teams
| 26 || 1 || 10.0 || .304 || .275 || .810 || 1.2 || 1.2 || 0.4 || 0.1 || 0.7 || 3.3

Personal life
Rodgers is an ambassador for Up2Us Sports, a national non-profit organization dedicated to supporting underserved youth by providing them with coaches trained in positive youth development.

References

External links
WNBA Draft profile
Georgetown Hoyas bio
espnW interview

Living people
1989 births
American expatriate basketball people in France
American women's basketball players
Basketball players from Virginia
Georgetown Hoyas women's basketball players
Guards (basketball)
Las Vegas Aces players
McDonald's High School All-Americans
Minnesota Lynx draft picks
Minnesota Lynx players
New York Liberty players
Parade High School All-Americans (girls' basketball)
Sportspeople from Suffolk, Virginia
Women's National Basketball Association All-Stars